Ekstasis is the second studio album by Nicky Skopelitis, released on 1993 through Axiom.

Track listing

Personnel 
Musicians
Bachir Attar – flute (2), ghaita (5)
Aïyb Dieng – ghaṭam (3, 6), talking drum (5, 8)
Guilherme Franco – cuíca (2, 3), electric berimbau (3, 6), whistle (2), cowbell (3), tambourine (4), congas (10)
Zakir Hussain – tabla (1)
Bill Laswell – bass guitar (2, 3, 6, 10), production
Jaki Liebezeit – drums (2, 4, 5, 7-9)
Ziggy Modeliste – drums (1, 3, 6, 10)
Amina Claudine Myers – Hammond B-3 (2, 3, 5, 6, 8, 10)
Simon Shaheen – violin (1, 2, 4, 6, 9), Oud (2)
Nicky Skopelitis – electric guitar, twelve-string guitar, bağlama (3, 9), Coral sitar (6), Dobro (9), production
Foday Musa Suso – harp (1, 8, 9), kora (4, 7)
Jah Wobble – bass guitar (1, 4, 5, 7-9)

Production and additional personnel
Martin Bisi – engineering
Bruce Calder – engineering
Ira Cohen – photography
Chris Flam – assistant engineering
Oz Fritz – engineering, mixing
James Koehnline – cover art
Imad Mansour – assistant engineering
Robert Musso – engineering
Aldo Sampieri – design
Howie Weinberg – mastering

References

External links 
 
 Ekstasis at Bandcamp

1993 albums
Albums produced by Bill Laswell
Axiom (record label) albums
Nicky Skopelitis albums